Goodenia neglecta  is a species of flowering plant in the family Goodeniaceae and is endemic to the Northern Territory of Australia. It is an ascending, weak-stemmed herb with toothed, egg-shaped leaves and racemes of yellow flowers.

Description
Leaves on the stem are similar but decrease in size up the stem.

Taxonomy and naming
The species was first formally described in 1979 by Roger Charles Carolin who gave it the name Calogyne neglecta in the journal Brunonia from specimens he collected on Mudgenbury Station in 1968. In 1990, Carolin changed the name to Goodenia neglecta in the journal Telopea.

Distribution and habitat
This goodenia grows in damp places in woodland in Arnhem Land.

Conservation status
Goodenia neglecta is classified as "least concern" under the Northern Territory Government Territory Parks and Wildlife Conservation Act 1976.

References

neglecta
Flora of the Northern Territory
Plants described in 1979
Taxa named by Roger Charles Carolin